Shin Shin may refer to:
Mitsubishi X-2 Shinshin, Japanese stealth aircraft
Shin Shin (giant panda)